The Wilson Complex is a 4,250 seat multi-purpose arena in Las Vegas, New Mexico, United States.  It was built in 1986.  It is the home of the New Mexico Highlands University Cowboys basketball and volleyball teams. The facility also houses offices for the school's athletic coaches.

References

Basketball venues in New Mexico
College basketball venues in the United States
College volleyball venues in the United States
Las Vegas, New Mexico
New Mexico Highlands Cowboys and Cowgirls
Volleyball venues in New Mexico
Sports venues completed in 1986
1986 establishments in New Mexico